The  is a title contested for in the Japanese promotion Big Japan Pro Wrestling. As its name suggests, it is exclusively defended in deathmatches. It was first created in 1998 when The Great Pogo defeated Mitsuhiro Matsunaga in a tournament final. There have been a total of 22 recognized champions who have had a combined 45 official reigns. The current champion is Hideyoshi Kamitani who is in this first reign.

Inaugural tournament
A single elimination tournament was set up to crown the inaugural champion which took place between June 8 and August 9, 1998.

Title history

Combined reigns

Notes

References

External links
BJW official site
 BJW Deathmatch Heavyweight Title History at Cagematch.net

Big Japan Pro Wrestling championships
Hardcore wrestling championships
Heavyweight wrestling championships